Gurab Pas Rural District is a rural district (dehestan) in the Central District of Fuman County, Gilan Province, Iran. At the 2006 census, its population was 11,312, in 2,980 families. The rural district has 21 villages.

References 

Rural Districts of Gilan Province
Fuman County